Broxbourne Woods are a 239.1 hectare National Nature Reserve west of Broxbourne in Hertfordshire. The site is Hertfordshire's only National Nature Reserve, and is also a Special Area of Conservation. It covers Hoddesdonpark Wood, Wormley Wood, Broxbourne Wood and Bencroft Wood. Bencroft and Broxbourne are owned by Hertfordshire County Council, and Hoddesdonpark and Wormley Woods by the Woodland Trust. They are all in Sites of Special Scientific Interest; Wormley Wood and Bencroft Wood form almost all of Wormley-Hoddesdonpark Wood South, and Hoddesdonpark Wood and Broxbourne Wood are part of Wormley-Hoddesdonpark Wood North.

The site is a large area of sessile oak and hornbeam woodland with diverse wildlife Flowers include bluebells, and invertebrates the rare purple emperor butterfly.

There is access to Hoddesdonpark Wood from Lord Street, to Broxbourne Wood from Pembridge Lane, and to Wormley and Bencroft Woods from White Stubbs Lane.

References

National nature reserves in England
Nature reserves in Hertfordshire
Broxbourne